Thomas Francis Kearns Jr. (born October 6, 1936) is an American former professional basketball player.

Born in New York City, he played collegiately for the University of North Carolina, where he played an integral role on the 1957 National Championship team. In an effort to rattle the 7-foot 1-inch Wilt Chamberlain of the Kansas Jayhawks in the national championship game, North Carolina coach Frank McGuire sent Kearns out at the start of the game to jump center. Kearns lost the tip-off but scored 11 points during the game. He was named first-team All-ACC in 1957 and 1958 and second-team All-America in 1957. Because of his national accolades, Kearns' number 40 was honored by the University of North Carolina and currently hangs in the rafters of the Dean Smith Center.

He was selected by the Syracuse Nationals in the fourth round (29th pick overall) of the 1958 NBA draft. He played for the Nationals in the NBA for one game. He scored two points during his professional basketball career.

In 2000, he played coach Garrick in Finding Forrester, a film directed by Gus Van Sant with Sean Connery and Rob Brown.

References

External links

1936 births
Living people
All-American college men's basketball players
American men's basketball players
Basketball players from New York City
North Carolina Tar Heels men's basketball players
Point guards
St. Ann's Academy (Manhattan) alumni
Syracuse Nationals draft picks
Syracuse Nationals players